Brushcreek Township is one of the seventeen townships of Highland County, Ohio, United States. As of the 2010 census the population was 1,381, of whom 1,248 lived in the unincorporated portion of the township.

Geography
Located in the southeastern corner of the county, it borders the following townships:
Paint Township - north
Perry Township, Pike County - northeast
Mifflin Township, Pike County - east
Franklin Township, Adams County - southeast corner
Bratton Township, Adams County - south
Jackson Township - southwest
Marshall Township - northwest

The village of Sinking Spring is located in southeastern Brushcreek Township.

Name and history
It is the only Brushcreek Township statewide, although Brush Creek Townships are located in Adams, Jefferson, Muskingum, and Scioto counties.

Government
The township is governed by a three-member board of trustees, who are elected in November of odd-numbered years to a four-year term beginning on the following January 1. Two are elected in the year after the presidential election and one is elected in the year before it. There is also an elected township fiscal officer, who serves a four-year term beginning on April 1 of the year after the election, which is held in November of the year before the presidential election. Vacancies in the fiscal officership or on the board of trustees are filled by the remaining trustees.

References

External links
County website

Townships in Highland County, Ohio
Townships in Ohio